Basireddypalli is a Gram panchayat located in Darsi mandal of Prakasam district of Andhra Pradesh, India.

Geography
Basireddy Palli is located towards  on the west side of Darsi.

Assembly constituency

Darsi is an assembly constituency in Andhra Pradesh, one of 12 in Prakasham district. In last elections, TDP candidate Sidda Raghava Rao won by a margin of 1374 votes on Buchepalli Siva Prasad Reddy. Dirisala Ramanareddy was first Chairman of Prakasam Zilla Parishad in 1970 till his last days.

References 

Villages in Prakasam district